The Bale language, Akar-Bale (also Balwa), is an extinct Southern Great Andamanese language once spoken in the Andaman Islands in Ritchie's Archipelago, Havelock Island, and Neill Island.

History
The Bale disappeared as a distinct people sometime after 1931.

Grammar
The Great Andamanese languages are agglutinative languages, with an extensive prefix and suffix system.  They have a distinctive noun class system based largely on body parts, in which every noun and adjective may take a prefix according to which body part it is associated with (on the basis of shape, or functional association). Thus, for instance, the *aka- at the beginning of the language names is a prefix for objects related to the tongue.  An adjectival example can be given by the various forms of yop, "pliable, soft", in Aka-Bea: 
A cushion or sponge is ot-yop "round-soft", from the prefix attached to words relating to the head or heart.
A cane is ôto-yop, "pliable", from a prefix for long things.
A stick or pencil is aka-yop, "pointed", from the tongue prefix.
A fallen tree is ar-yop, "rotten", from the prefix for limbs or upright things.
Similarly, beri-nga "good" yields:
un-bēri-ŋa "clever" (hand-good).
ig-bēri-ŋa "sharp-sighted" (eye-good).
aka-bēri-ŋa "good at languages" (tongue-good.)
ot-bēri-ŋa "virtuous" (head/heart-good)

The prefixes are,

Body parts are inalienably possessed, requiring a possessive adjective prefix to complete them, so one cannot say "head" alone, but only "my, or his, or your, etc. head".

The basic pronouns are almost identical throughout the Great Andamanese languages; Aka-Bea will serve as a representative example (pronouns given in their basic prefixal forms):

'This' and 'that' are distinguished as k- and t-. 

Judging from the available sources, the Andamanese languages have only two cardinal numbers — one and two — and their entire numerical lexicon is one, two, one more, some more, and all.

See also
Andamanese languages

References

Agglutinative languages
Great Andamanese languages
Extinct languages of Asia
Languages extinct in the 20th century